Ntem may refer to:

Ntem (department), Gabon
Campo River, also called the Ntem, between Cameroon, Gabon and Equatorial Guinea
Yamba language, also called the Ntem, in Cameroon

See also
Woleu-Ntem Province, Gabon